Buckhead Forest is a neighborhood of 165 homes in the Buckhead district of Atlanta, Georgia.

It is bounded by:

 Peachtree Road and Buckhead Village on the southeast
 Roswell Road and South Tuxedo Park on the west
 Piedmont Road and North Buckhead on the northeast

Government
Buckhead Forest is part of NPU B.

See also

References

External links
 Buckhead Forest Civic Association
 Buckhead Forest Civic Association on Facebook

Neighborhoods in Atlanta